Stumptown AC, formerly Stumptown Athletic, was an American professional soccer team that played in the National Independent Soccer Association (NISA). The club is based in Matthews, North Carolina, a suburb of Charlotte.

History
Following an initial bid in late 2017, the team was first announced by the National Independent Soccer Association on October 23, 2018 with plans to begin play in the inaugural 2019–20 season. Originally referred to in league press releases simply as "Charlotte", the name Stumptown Athletic was officially unveiled in June 2019. The name came from an early nickname for Matthews derived from the fact that farmers cut down so many trees to clear land that the town was left full of tree stumps.

The team was originally owned by Christopher Clarke of Atlanta, a lawyer specializing in wealth management, and Casey Carr, a former college soccer player with the DePaul Blue Demons and an entrepreneur based out of Mecklenburg County. Carr also served as the club's president and GM.

On July 21, 2019 the club appointed Mark Steffens as head coach. Steffens previously coached the Charlotte Eagles and served as an assistant for the Charlotte Lady Eagles. In August, Stumptown announced former Jamaica national football team player Michael Binns and Jared Odenbeck as their first signings.

During the Fall 2019 showcase, Stumptown competed within the East Coast Conference and finished second in their group. In the championship game the team fell to Miami FC, 3–0. After two matches in the Spring 2020 season, NISA announced a suspension of play due to the COVID-19 pandemic. Eventually, the entire Spring Season was cancelled outright.

Following a hiatus during the Fall 2020 season, the team's original front office dissolved the club and it was reformed under the new name Stumptown AC on March 3, 2021. Soccer executive Fred Matthes and former Portland Timbers assistant coach Rod Underwood were announced as the new team president and head coach, respectively.

The club's supporters' group is the QC Royals, which was founded in 2015.

Stadium
In 2021, the team announced it would play exclusively at the Sportsplex at Matthews and has played all of its home games there since.

Players and staff

Current roster

Technical staff

Logo history

Year-by-year

References

External links
 

2018 establishments in North Carolina
Association football clubs established in 2018
Soccer clubs in North Carolina
Sports teams in Charlotte, North Carolina
National Independent Soccer Association teams